Donát Bartók (born 13 July 1996) is a Hungarian handball player for Kadetten Schaffhausen and the Hungarian national handball team.

Career
He joined the Bundesliga team TBV Lemgo in November 2016. On his debut match he broke his finger and was unable to play for 8 weeks. In August 2017 he prolonged his contract with the club until 2020. In December 2019 he decided to leave his club, because of the lack of playing time. He joined Bidasoa Irún in January 2020. He joined Kadetten Schaffhausen in January 2021.

He made his debut in the national team in January 2018 against Sweden.

Personal life
His father, Csaba Bartók is a former handballer who played for the Hungarian national handball team.

References

External links

Oregfiuk.hu
tbv-lemgo.de

1996 births
Living people
Hungarian male handball players
Sportspeople from Szeged
Expatriate handball players
Hungarian expatriate sportspeople in Germany
Hungarian expatriate sportspeople in Spain
Handball-Bundesliga players
Liga ASOBAL players